Strmica is a small village in the Knin Municipality. It is located north of Knin, just south of the border to Bosnia & Herzegovina. The population is 268 (census 2001).

External links
 Strmica

Populated places in Šibenik-Knin County
Knin